Gold Digger is a six-part drama miniseries created and written by Marnie Dickens and starring Julia Ormond and Ben Barnes broadcast weekly from Tuesday 12 November 2019 on BBC One. Unusually for a BBC series, all episodes became available on BBC iPlayer on the day of the first episode's television broadcast and the series was broadcast internationally. The series has been described by the BBC as a contemporary relationship thriller, about second chances, family and betrayal.

Premise
After putting her own life behind the lives of everyone around her, a wealthy 60-year-old woman enters into a relationship with a man half her age. Her adult children worry that he's a gold digger.

Cast and characters
Julia Ormond as Julia Day, a wealthy 60-year-old who falls in love with a younger man.
Ben Barnes as Benjamin Greene, Julia's 36-year-old boyfriend.
Alex Jennings as Ted Day, Julia's ex-husband.
Sebastian Armesto as Patrick Day, the oldest of Julia and Ted's children.
Yasmine Akram as Eimear Day, Patrick's wife.
Jemima Rooper as Della Day, Julia and Ted's daughter.
Archie Renaux as Leo Day, the 25-year-old son of Julia and Ted, who still lives with his mother.
Nikki Amuka-Bird as Marsha, Julia's former best friend who had an affair with Ted.
Karla-Simone Spence as Cali Okello, Marsha's daughter, the troubled young adult dealing with the loss of her father.
Julia McKenzie as Hazel, Ted's mother.
Indica Watson as Charlotte Day, Patrick's daughter and Julia's granddaughter.
David Leon as Kieran, Benjamin's half-brother.

Episodes

 Ratings include pre-transmission.

Production
It was announced in August 2018 that Julia Ormond would be starring in the six part miniseries, commissioned by the BBC. The first three episodes of the series were directed by Vanessa Caswill. Ben Barnes was cast later that month. The supporting cast, including Alex Jennings, Jemima Rooper and Sebastian Armesto, was added as filming began between Devon and London. Filming commenced in September 2018.

Reception
On Rotten Tomatoes, the show holds an approval rating of 57%. The critical consensus reads: "Visually gorgeous and thematically ambitious, but ultimately void of cohesion, Gold Digger bites off more than it can chew."

Lucy Mangan of The Guardian, however called the show "a bold and hugely entertaining attempt by writer Marnie Dickens."

References

External links
 

2019 British television series debuts
2019 British television series endings
2010s British drama television series
2010s British television miniseries
BBC high definition shows
BBC television dramas
English-language television shows